Emwah Warmington (born December 23, 1996), known professionally as Skillibeng, is a Jamaican dancehall singer and rapper from St. Thomas, noted for his works with Vybez Kartel, DJ Khaled, Sean Paul, Nicki Minaj, Wizkid, Rich the Kid, Kali Uchis, Popcaan, J.I the Prince of N.Y, and French Montana. 

Warmington has released two EPs, one compilation and three albums: Prodigy (2019), The Prodigy (2020), The Prodigy, Ladies Only Edition (2021), Crocodile Teeth (2021), Mr. Universe (2022) and Eastsyde (2023). In 2020 and 2022, The Face and I.D magazine profiled him as Jamaica's new dancehall hope and as Jamaica's hottest artist.

Early life 
Warmington was born in St. Thomas, and grew up in the rural community of Lyssons.

Career 
Warmington is signed to RCA Records and Eastsyde records. On October 2015, he released his first official single "Pain & Emotion", the same year he released his second single "Skilli She Love", with the radio edit released the same day. In August 2019, he released his 9-track debut extended play "Prodigy". In January 2020, Warmington released his 35-track debut studio album The Prodigy, the album debuted on the US Current Reggae Albums Chart and peaked at number 16. His second studio album The Prodigy: Ladies Only Edition was released in May 28, 2021. The same year, he released his third studio album Crocodile Teeth.

Warmington is the winner of best Caribbean Music Act at the Mobo Awards of 2022.

References

External links 

 Skillibeng at AllMusic

Living people
1996 births
Jamaican musicians
Dancehall musicians
Reggae musicians
People from Saint Thomas Parish, Jamaica